Nott Street School is a historic school building located at Schenectady, Schenectady County, New York. It was originally built in 1877 as a four-room school, with an eight classroom addition completed in 1909. It is a two-story, red brick building above a stone and concrete raised basement. The exterior has been painted since at least 1952. The building was used as a school until 1942, and has since been used for offices.

It was added to the National Register of Historic Places in 2011.

References

School buildings on the National Register of Historic Places in New York (state)
School buildings completed in 1877
Schools in Schenectady County, New York
National Register of Historic Places in Schenectady County, New York
1877 establishments in New York (state)